Interstate 435 (I-435) is an Interstate Highway beltway that encircles much of the Kansas City metropolitan area within the states of Kansas and Missouri in the United States.

Route description

The majority——of I-435 is within the state of Missouri, and most of that roadway lies within the city limits of Kansas City. The first/last exit is at I-435's parent route, I-35, in Lenexa, Kansas. Going clockwise around Kansas City, the next interchange is exit 1A for Lackman Road. The milepost numbers do not start over when I-435 crosses the state line, but where it shares the same roadway as I-29, the latter's milepost (and therefore exit) numbering takes precedence.

History
I-435 in Kansas City was built piece by piece starting in the mid-1960s and not finished until 1987.

In 1965, the first segment of I-435 was built and opened between I-35 and US 69 (which, at that time, was signed with Metcalf Avenue) near Overland Park, Kansas. A second segment was opened the same year between I-70 and US 50 in eastern Kansas City, Missouri, but the two were not connected. The eastern segment of I-435 was extended south to Gregory Boulevard and north past 23rd Street/Route 78 by 1968. By 1969, I-435 was fully built between these two segments, through southern and eastern Kansas City. The freeway was extended from 23rd Street/Route 78 to US 24 two years later. In 1973, I-435 was extended north from the former terminus of US 24 across the Missouri River to I-35 in Claycomo. It now extended halfway around the city. In 1983, a small segment was opened on the outskirts of Kansas City north between US 169 and Route 291 near Kansas City International Airport (KCI). Later, this small segment was connected with the rest of the freeway. A segment was built heading almost due north from I-35 in Claycomo to Route 291/Cookingham Drive at North Reinking Road, curving due west from there to US 169. In this year, the southwest end was also extended to K-10. In 1987, the freeway was opened all the way around the city. It crossed several small highways before crossing the Missouri River into Wyandotte County, Kansas. It continued generally south or southwest, crossed several state highways and I-70, then the Kaw River, before connecting with the former southwest end at K-10.

Exit list

See also
 Downtown Loop (Kansas City)

Notes

References

External links

 Kansas Highway Maps: Current, Historic, KDOT

35-4
35-4
35-4
435
Transportation in Johnson County, Kansas
Transportation in Wyandotte County, Kansas
Transportation in Platte County, Missouri
Transportation in Clay County, Missouri
Transportation in Jackson County, Missouri
4
435